Hitler and the occult may refer to:
Hitler and the Occult, a 2000 documentary film produced by Bram Roos and Phyllis Cannon
Hitler and the Occult (book), a 1995 book by Ken Anderson
Occultism in Nazism

See also
Occultism and the far right (disambiguation)
Religious views of Adolf Hitler